Hovea acanthoclada, commonly known as thorny hovea, is a flowering plant in the family Fabaceae. It is an upright, prickly shrub with  small dark green leaves and purple-blue pea flowers in winter and spring. It is endemic to the south-west of Western Australia.

Description

Taxonomy and naming
Hovea acanthoclada was first formally described in 1863 by Ferdinand von Mueller and the description was published in Fragmenta Phytographiae Australiae. The specific epithet (acanthoclada) means  "spiny" and "branch".

Distribution and habitat
Thorny hovea grows in lateritic soils in the south-west near Ravensthorpe and gravelly locations near Kalgoorlie.

References

acanthoclada
Rosids of Western Australia
Taxa named by Nikolai Turczaninow